The World Senior Teams Championship is one of the competitions held as part of the World Bridge Championships. This event was initiated in 1994 and is held every four years. It is not necessary that all team members be from the same country. Prior to 2005 all members of each team had to be at least 55 years of age. The World Bridge Federation (WBF) has decided that, as from 2005, the minimum age for a player to be recognized as Senior will be increasing one year per year, until it reaches 60 years in 2010. The decision ensures that 55-year-olds who participated in a senior event in 2003 will never become ex-Seniors.

Results

References

External links
 Senior Bridge program overview at the World Bridge Federation
 World Senior KO Teams 1994–present (table) at the World Bridge Federation

Senior Teams
Senior sports competitions